Corgatha sideropasta is a species of moth of the family Erebidae. It is found in Australia.

Boletobiinae
Moths described in 1936